Luciano Zacharski (born December 17, 1985, in Buenos Aires, Argentina), is an Argentine actor, currently resides in Mexico City, Mexico.

Career 
In 2010 he joined in the "Centro de Formación Actoral de TV Azteca". He has had several characters in the series Lo que callamos las mujeres, and has participated in several telenovelas such as Cielo rojo, Quererte así, Vivir a destiempo and Siempre tuya Acapulco. In 2014 to 2015, he recorded the telenovela Así en el barrio como en el cielo which is his first starring role on television and plays Octavio Ferrara.

Filmography

Television

References

External links

Living people
Argentine male telenovela actors
1985 births
21st-century Argentine male actors